La Fregate or La Fregate Hotel may refer to many hotels and restaurants in France, Belgium or the Channel Islands:

France
La Fregate (Paris)
La Fregate (Collioure)
La Frégate (Le Faou)
Hotel La Fregate (Lège-Cap-Ferret)
La Fregate Sarl (Seyne sur Mer)
Hôtel La Frégate (Canet-en-Roussillon)

Elsewhere
 La Fregate Hotel (Guernsey)
La Frégate (Neufchâteau), Belgium